Meisho Mambo (foaled 25 February 2010) is a Japanese Thoroughbred racehorse who won the second and third legs of the Japanese Fillies' Triple Crown in 2013. She showed some promise as a juvenile in 2012 when winning on her debut. In the following spring she won the Grade II Fillies' Revue and rebounded from a poor run in the Oka Sho to win the Grade I Yushun Himba. She returned in the autumn to win the Shuka Sho before defeating older fillies and mares in the Queen Elizabeth II Commemorative Cup. She won the JRA Award for Best Three-Year-Old Filly of 2013. She stayed in training for three more seasons but failed to win again.

Background
Meisho Mambo is a bay mare with a white sock on her right hind leg bred in Japan by Kosho Bokujo, the breeding farm of her owner Yoshio Matsumoto. She was sent into training with Akihiro Iida and was ridden in most of her races by Koshiro Take. In her races Meisho Mambo usually wore a hood in the blue and pink colours of her owner.

She was sired by Suzuka Mambo (a son of Sunday Silence) who recorded his biggest win in the spring edition of the 2005 Tenno Sho. The best of his other runners has been the Champions Cup winner Sambista. Meisho Mambo's dam Meisho Momoka showed no racing ability, failing to win or place in twelve starts. She was a female-line descendant of Dianne K, an American broodmare who was imported to Japan in the 1950s.

Racing career

2012: two-year-old season
On 25 November Meisho Mambo made a successful racecourse debut when she won an event for previously unraced juveniles over 1400 metres at Kyoto Racecourse. She was the stepped up sharply in class for Japan's most prestigious race for two-year-old fillies, the Grade I Hanshin Juvenile Fillies over 1600 metres at Hanshin Racecourse in December and finished tenth of the eighteen runners, six lengths behind the winner Robe Tissage.

2013: three-year-old season

Spring
Meisho Mambo began her second season by finishing second to Red Oval over 1400 metres at Kyoto in January and then won a minor race over 1600 metres at the same track on 16 February. On 10 March she moved back up in class for the Grade II Fillies' Revue (a trial race for the Oka Sho) over 1400 metres at Hanshin and started the 3.4/1 third favourite in sixteen-runner field. Ridden by Yuga Kawada, she won by one and a quarter lengths from Nancy Shine. In the Oka Sho (the first leg of the Triple Crown) on 7 April the filly started the 7.7/1 fifth choice in the betting but finished only tenth behind Ayusan, who won by a neck from Red Oval. On 19 May Meisho Mambo was moved up in distance for the Grade I Yushun Himba over 2400 metres at Tokyo Racecourse and started a 28/1 outsider in an eighteen-runner field. The Flora Stakes winner Denim and Ruby started favourite whilst the other fancied runners included Ayusan, Red Oval, Robe Tissage, Kurofune Surprise (Tulip Sho) and the Flora Stakes runner-up Ever Blossom. After positioning Meisho Mambo in mid-division along the rail, Koshiro Take switched the filly to the right to make a challenge down the centre of the track in the straight. She took the lead 300 metres from the finish and won by one and a quarter lengths from Ever Blossom, with Denim and Ruby two lengths back in third place. Interviewed after the race Take said "It has been rarer more than ever that I'm riding in Grade 1 races so I'm especially pleased. All the staff took care of her very well after the Oka Sho. Her owner has given me chances every time and I'm very happy to win such big race with his horse".

Autumn
After a break of almost four months Meisho Mambo returned in the Group II Rose Stakes over 1800 metres at Hanshin in September. She finished fourth of the eighteen runners, beaten half a length, a nose and a neck by Denim and Ruby, Chateau Blanche and Uliuli. The third leg of the Triple Crown, the Shuka Sho was run over 1200 metres at Kyoto on 13 October and Meisho Mambo started the 4.2/1 third favourite behind Denim and Ruby and Smart Layer. The other fancied runners included Ever Blossom, Chateau Blanche Uliuli and Robe Tissage. Drawn towards the outside of the eighteen-runner field Meisho Mambo settled in mid division by Koshiro Take as the pace was set by the outsiders Venus Trick and Senkisho. She produced a strong late run on the outside to take the lead 50 metres from the finish and won by one and a quarter lengths from Smart Layer who came out best in a blanket finish for second. Smart Layer was ridden by Take's more famous older brother Yutaka. Koshiro Take commented "I was confident because her condition has been better. The stalls position was near the outside so I worried it a little but I decided to use her excellent stride."

At Kyoto on 10 November Meisho Mambo was matched against older fillies and mares for the first time in the Queen Elizabeth II Commemorative Cup over 2200 metres and started 2.9/1 second favourite behind the four-year-old Verxina the winner of the 2013 Victoria Mile. The other runners included Denim and Ruby, Whale Capture (2012 Victoria Mile) and All That Jazz (Fuchu Himba). Racing on soft ground on a rainy day she came from well off the pace to take the lead 200 metres from the finish and won by one and a quarter lengths and a neck from Lachesis and Aromatico. After the race Take said "This race was much tougher than the previous race, but she's a really strong filly and I’m looking forward to taking on stronger horses now."

In January 2014 at the JRA Awards Meisho Mambo was unanimously voted Japan's champion three-year-old filly of 2013.

2014–2016: Later career
When Akihiro Iida retired in February 2014 his stable was taken over by his son Yuji Iida. Meisho Mambo began her third season by taking on male opposition in the Osaka Hai in April and finishing seventh of the eight runners behind Kizuna. On 18 May at Tokyo she produced her best performance of the season as she finished a half length second to Verxina in the Victoria Mile with Straight Girl, Whale Capture, Denim and Ruby, Smart Layer, Robe Tissage, Ever Blossom, Lachesis and Uliuli finishing behind. She made little impact in her four subsequent races that year, finishing unplaced in the Takarazuka Kinen, Kyoto Daishoten, Queen Elizabeth II Cup and Arima Kinen.

Meisho Mambo remained in training for two more years but has never recovered her best form. She finished no better than sixth in seven races as a five-year-old and was unplaced in all of her six races in 2016.

Pedigree

Meisho Mambo was inbred 4 × 4 to Mr. Prospector, meaning that this stallion appears twice in the fourth generation of her pedigree.

References

2010 racehorse births
Racehorses bred in Japan
Racehorses trained in Japan
Thoroughbred family 9-c